Abiather J. Knowles (March 15, 1830 – February 11, 1905) was an American soldier who fought in the American Civil War. Knowles received his country's highest award for bravery during combat, the Medal of Honor. Knowles's medal was won for his actions during the First Battle of Bull Run in Prince William County, Virginia on July 21, 1861. He was honored with the award on December 27, 1894.

Knowles was from La Grange, Maine, and entered service at Willets Point in New York. He was later buried in La Grange.

Medal of Honor citation

See also
List of American Civil War Medal of Honor recipients: G–L

References

1830 births
1905 deaths
19th-century American people
American Civil War recipients of the Medal of Honor
People of Maine in the American Civil War
People from Penobscot County, Maine
Union Army soldiers
United States Army Medal of Honor recipients